Starace may refer to:
Achille Starace (1889–1945), a leader of Fascist Italy
Giorgio Starace (born 1959), Italian diplomat
Girolamo Starace (c.1745–1785), baroque period painter
Francesco Starace (born 1955), Italian business executive
Potito Starace (born 1981), Italian tennis player